The Legislature of the State of Querétaro (Spanish: Legislatura del Estado de Querétaro) is the unicameral legislature of the Mexican State of Querétaro, invested with the State's legislative power. Unlike in other States of Mexico, where the deliberative body is called "Congress" (Spanish: Congreso), Querétaro's Constitution states that the name of the State's deliberative body is "Legislature" (Spanish: Legislatura).

Deputies to the Legislature serve a term of 3 years, renewable three times, serving a maximum of four consecutive periods. The last election was held on June 6, 2021. The Legislature is currently composed of 25 deputies, 15 of which are elected through plurality voting in uninominal districts, while the remaining 10 are elected via proportional representation in a state-wide list

References 

Legislatures of Mexican states
Government of Querétaro